Pomona Park is a town in Putnam County, Florida, United States. The population was 912 at the 2010 census and has gone up to 916 in the 2018 estimates. The town is part of the Palatka Micropolitan Statistical Area.

Geography

Pomona Park is located at  (29.496066, –81.600379).

Demographics

As of the census of 2000, there were 789 people, 349 households, and 204 families residing in the town. The racial makeup of the town was 86.19% White, 10.90% African American, 0.51% Native American, 1.77% from other races, and 0.63% from two or more races. Hispanic or Latino of any race were 3.93% of the population.

There were 349 households, out of which 22.3% had children under the age of 18 living with them, 45.8% were married couples living together, 7.7% had a female householder with no husband present, and 41.5% were non-families. 36.4% of all households were made up of individuals, and 18.6% had someone living alone who was 65 years of age or older.  The average household size was 2.19 and the average family size was 2.81.

In the town, the population was spread out, with 20.0% under the age of 18, 6.7% from 18 to 24, 23.7% from 25 to 44, 23.6% from 45 to 64, and 26.0% who were 65 years of age or older.  The median age was 44 years. For every 100 females, there were 97.7 males.  For every 100 females age 18 and over, there were 96.0 males.

The median income for a household in the town was $25,536, and the median income for a family was $32,750. Males had a median income of $25,568 versus $15,469 for females. The per capita income for the town was $14,319.  About 16.1% of families and 25.5% of the population were below the poverty line, including 32.3% of those under age 18 and 19.7% of those age 65 or over.

External links 
 Pomona Park Town website

References

Towns in Putnam County, Florida
Towns in Florida